Dayeuhluhur is a district within the Cilacap Regency of Central Java.

History
Dayeuhluhur began as a Kadipaten or Duchy of Daya Luhur  under Gagak Ngampar.
Dayeuhluhur is place the popular Sondanese epic of Ciung Wanara in Cijolang River area.

As subdistrict
Dayeuhluhur District was established in 1979 and was formalized in 1980 based on Government Regulation of the Republic of Indonesia number 21 of 1979 date April 30, 1979.

Economy
The economy of Dayeuhluhur is dominated by mountain farming.

Demographics
Dayeuhluhur has a population of ~52,000 people, of which 96% are Sundanese and use the traditional Sundanese language. The majority of the inhabitants work as farmers.

Geography
Dayeuhluhur is located on Mount Subang at the highest point within the Cilacap Regency. It is located in the tropical forest of the region, with the Cibeet, Cikawalon and Cidayeuh rivers running through it.

The district is home to 14 individual villages:
Hanum
Datar
Panulisan
Cijeruk
Cilumping
Bolang
Kutaagung
Bolang
Dayeuhluhur
Sumpinghayu
Ciwalen
West Panulisan
East Panulisan
Matenggeng

Points of attraction
Several sites sacred to the  Dayeuhluhuran Sundanese religion are located in or near Dayeuhluhur, including
 Mount Ketra
 Mount Sembung
 Cibeet River
 Baledana Hill

Such places are traditionally under the care of a custodian called a juru kunci (key keeper).

Dayeuhluhur is also home to scenic attractions such as the Cimandaway waterfall and The Forbidden Forest of the Upper Cibeet River.

Gallery

References
 Dayeuhluhur, Java. Mapcarta

 
Cilacap Regency
Districts of Central Java